Hätteberget is the name of a Swedish docking lighthouse situated in the sea west of Marstrand and south of Tjörn. It was built in 1977 as a replacement for the old Pater Noster Lighthouse. The lighthouse is a  concrete tower with helicopter landing. It is painted with a red belt and has a gray cap on top. The light from the white sector can reach .

See also

 List of lighthouses and lightvessels in Sweden

References

External links
 Sjofartsverket  
 The Swedish Lighthouse Society
 Picture of Hätteberget Lighthouse

Lighthouses completed in 1977
Lighthouses in Sweden
Buildings and structures in Västra Götaland County